LTSP may refer to:

 Linux Terminal Server Project
 Lutheran Theological Seminary at Philadelphia